Wittwer is a surname. Notable people with the surname include:

 Adrian Alejandro Wittwer (born 1986), Swiss extreme athlete and ice swimmer
 Andreas Wittwer (born 1990), Swiss professional footballer
 Hans Wittwer (1894–1952), Swiss architect and Bauhaus teacher
 Michael Wittwer (born 1967), German footballer 
 Otto Wittwer (born 1937), Swiss professional ice hockey player
 Stefan Wittwer (born 1971), Swiss Nordic skier
 Sylvan Wittwer (1917–2012), American agronomist
 Uwe Wittwer (born 1954), Swiss artist